Robert Lukas may refer to:
 Robert Lukas (ice hockey) (born 1978), Austrian ice hockey defenceman
 Robert Lukas (racing driver) (born 1988), Polish racing driver